The 1990 America East men's basketball tournament was hosted by the Hartford Hawks at the Hartford Civic Center. Boston University gained its third overall America East Conference Championship and an automatic berth to the NCAA tournament with its win over Vermont. Boston University was given the 16th seed in the East Regional of the NCAA Tournament and lost in the first round to Connecticut 76–52.

Bracket and Results

See also
America East Conference

References

America East Conference men's basketball tournament
1989–90 North Atlantic Conference men's basketball season